The Santa Cruz Estate is a former imperial country retreat in Santa Cruz, Rio de Janeiro. Originally a Jesuit estate and convent dating from 1570, it became a residence of the Portuguese viceroys in Brazil at the end of the 18th century. When King John VI and the royal family moved the court to Brazil in 1808, the palace became a royal residence. After the king's return to Portugal, the Prince Regent Pedro I continued to use the palace. Upon his marriage to princess Leopoldina in 1818, they spent their honeymoon in the palace. The estate became one of the imperial palaces with the independence of Brazil in 1822. Emperor Pedro II later used the palace as a summer residence.

Following proclamation of a republic in 1889, the palace was converted to a military school. It has continued to function as an academy to the present.

References

 Freitas, Benedicto. Santa Cruz-Fazenda Jesuítica, Real e Imperial. Volumes I, II e III. Rio de Janeiro, Asa Artes Gráficas: 1985.
 Gama, José de Saldanha da. História da Imperial Fazenda de Santa Cruz. Revista do IHGB - Tomo 38

External links
 http://www.quarteirao.com.br/imperial.html
 http://leituradaslentes.blogspot.nl/2012/02/fazenda-dos-jesuitas-fazenda-imperial.html
 Santa Cruz Estate
 http://agenciabrasil.ebc.com.br/noticia/2011-05-16/historiador-alerta-para-descaso-com-patrimonio-da-fazenda-nacional-de-santa-cruz An article about the current state of the palace

Santa Cruz, Imperial palace of
Palaces in Brazil